The 2015 Wilson Security Sandown 500 was a motor race event for the Australian sedan-based V8 Supercars. It was the ninth event of the 2015 International V8 Supercars Championship. It was held on the weekend of 11-13 September at the Sandown Raceway, near Melbourne in Victoria, Australia. The feature race, the 2015 Wilson Security Sandown 500, was won by Mark Winterbottom and Steve Owen driving a Ford FG X Falcon.

Results

Qualifying

Qualifying Race 1 (Co-drivers)

Qualifying Race 2 (Primary drivers)

Race 

Note: Percat did not drive car #222 in the main race.

References

External links

Sandown
Motorsport at Sandown
Pre-Bathurst 500
September 2015 sports events in Australia